Saint-Quentin may refer to:

Places

Canada
Saint-Quentin, New Brunswick
Saint-Quentin Parish, New Brunswick
Saint-Quentin Island, in Trois-Rivières, in Québec

France
 Saint-Quentin, Aisne, in the Aisne department
 Saint-Quentin-en-Yvelines, a new town in the Yvelines department
 Saint-Quentin-au-Bosc, in the Seine-Maritime department
 Saint-Quentin-de-Baron, in the Gironde department
 Saint-Quentin-de-Blavou, in the Orne department
 Saint-Quentin-de-Caplong, in the Gironde department
 Saint-Quentin-de-Chalais, in the Charente department
 Saint-Quentin-des-Isles, in the Eure department
 Saint-Quentin-des-Prés, in the Oise department
 Saint-Quentin-du-Dropt, in the Lot-et-Garonne department
 Saint-Quentin-en-Mauges, in the Maine-et-Loire department
 Saint-Quentin-en-Tourmont, in the Somme department
 Saint-Quentin-Fallavier, in the Isère department
 Saint-Quentin-la-Chabanne, in the Creuse department
 Saint-Quentin-la-Motte-Croix-au-Bailly, in the Somme department
 Saint-Quentin-la-Poterie, in the Gard department
 Saint-Quentin-la-Tour, in the Ariège department
 Saint-Quentin-le-Petit, in the Ardennes department
 Saint-Quentin-les-Anges, in the Mayenne department
 Saint-Quentin-lès-Beaurepaire, in the Maine-et-Loire department
 Saint-Quentin-les-Chardonnets, in the Orne department
 Saint-Quentin-les-Marais, in the Marne department
 Saint-Quentin-le-Verger, in the Marne department
 Saint-Quentin-sur-Charente, in the Charente department
 Saint-Quentin-sur-Coole, in the Marne department
 Saint-Quentin-sur-Indrois, in the Indre-et-Loire department
 Saint-Quentin-sur-Isère, in the Isère department
 Saint-Quentin-sur-le-Homme, in the Manche department
 Saint-Quentin-sur-Nohain, in the Nièvre department
 Saint-Quentin-sur-Sauxillanges, in the Puy-de-Dôme department

Other
 Basilica of Saint-Quentin, formerly the Collegiate Church of Saint-Quentin, a Catholic church in the town of Saint-Quentin, Aisne, France

See also
 Saint Quentin (died 287), early Christian saint
 Battle of St. Quentin (disambiguation)
 San Quintin (disambiguation)
 San Quentin (disambiguation)
 Sant Quintí (disambiguation)